The Tenderfoot is a 1932 American Pre-Code comedy western film directed by Ray Enright and written by Earl Baldwin, Monty Banks and Arthur Caesar. The film stars Joe E. Brown and Ginger Rogers. The film was released by Warner Bros. on May 23, 1932. It is based on Richard Carle's 1903 play The Tenderfoot, and George S. Kaufman's 1925 play The Butter and Egg Man.

The play was first adapted to film The Butter and Egg Man in 1928. It was remade as Dance Charlie Dance (1937) and An Angel from Texas (1940), and enough of the plot elements were worked into Hello, Sweetheart (1935) and Three Sailors and a Girl (1953) to warrant a credit for Kaufman's play as a basis of those scripts. An Angel from Texas was directed by Ray Enright, who also directed The Tenderfoot. Enright and Brown worked together on five pictures.

Plot
Calvin Jones (Joe E. Brown), a naive cowboy from Texas, comes to New York City, determined to take care of his mother by investing his life savings in a Broadway show. He is duped by producers Lehman (Lew Cody) and McLure into buying a 49-percent interest in their new show, a surefire flop.

Lehman's beautiful secretary, Ruth Weston (Ginger Rogers), catches the shy cowboy's eye. Jones makes up his mind to produce the play by himself after Lehman and McLure close it out of town. When he can't pay for proper costumes, his star actress quits, so Ruth goes on in her place.

Although the play is a drama, it is so poorly done that the audience mistakes it for a comedy. The laughter makes it a surprise comedy hit. Jones and Ruth make a big profit, get married and decide to live in Texas.

Cast    
 Joe E. Brown as Calvin Jones
 Ginger Rogers as Ruth Weston
 Lew Cody as Joe Lehman
 Vivien Oakland as Miss Martin
 Robert Greig as Mack
 Ralph Ince as Dolan
 Marion Byron as Kitty (as Marion Bryon)
 Spencer Charters as Oscar
 Douglas Gerrard as Stage Director

References

External links
 
 
 
 

1932 films
1930s English-language films
1930s Western (genre) comedy films
American musical comedy films
1932 musical comedy films
Films directed by Ray Enright
American black-and-white films
1930s American films